Hirvan (also Romanized as Hīrvān; also known as Harvān) is a village in Molla Yaqub Rural District, in the Central District of Sarab County, East Azerbaijan Province, Iran. At the 2006 census, its population was 617, in 136 families.

References 

Populated places in Sarab County